Staple is a Christian hard rock/post-hardcore group from Mechanicsburg, Ohio. Staple was founded in 2000 when the members met at Rosedale Bible College in Ohio.

History

The first era (2000-2006)
Staple released a full-length album and EP independently before signing to Flicker Records in 2004. They released their debut album, Staple, in 2004, followed by a second, Of Truth and Reconciliation, in 2005.

They toured with Disciple, the Showdown, Kids in the Way, Demon Hunter, Last Tuesday, Dizmas, Stalemate, the 7 Method and Spoken. Their 2005 album, Of Truth and Reconciliation, peaked at No. 49 on the Billboard Top Christian Albums chart.

On May 17, 2006, Staple announced that they would be breaking up at the end of the summer. In May 2006, Staple held a contest for fans to create a last tour T-shirt. The shirt was judged by Staple. Winners received two free admissions to one of the dates on the "Last Crusade" tour, a free copy of the printed shirt that they designed and a copy of Staple's CDs

The second era (2009-2014)
In February 2009, Darin Keim announced that Staple was reuniting with new members. In May, he announced that a new song called "Eager Hearts" would be put online, with two other songs to be uploaded in successive weeks. A blog was published stating that the two other songs were called "Perfect Dark" and "The Giant Sleeps No More", and that together with "Eager Hearts" these songs would make up The Gatekeeper EP.

The band appears to have broken up.

Members
Darin Keim - vocals (2000–2006, 2009–present)
Bob Miller - bass guitar (2009–present)
J.M. Haddix- drums (2009–present) (Sides of the North)
Ryan Pattengale - guitar (2009–present) (Red Morning Voyage)
John Carnahan - guitar (2009–present) (The Machine)

Former members
Grant Beachy - drums (2000–2005)
Brian Miller - guitar (2000–2006)
Paul DeLozier - guitar (2005)
Josh McNeal - drums (2006)
Israel Beachy - bass guitar (2000–2006)
Brando Hall - guitar (2009-2009)

Influences
Living Sacrifice
Project 86
Stavesacre
Stalemate

Discography

Albums

Singles

References

  ChristianRock.Net

External links
Official Staple MySpace
Flicker Records
Staple on PureVolume

Christian rock groups from Ohio
American post-hardcore musical groups
Flicker Records artists
Musical groups established in 2000